Kim Yi-su (born 24 March 1953) is a former Justice of the Constitutional Court of Korea.

Career 
1982        Judge, Daejeon District Court

1984        Judge, Hongseong Branch of Daejeon District court

1986        Judge, Daejeon District Court

1987        Judge, Suwon District Court

1989        Judge, Seoul High Court

1991        Research Judge, Supreme Court

1993        Senior Judge, Seoul Civil District Court

1993        Chief Judge, Jeongju Branch of Jeonju District Court

1996        Professor of Judicial Research and Training Institute

1999        Senior Judge, Seoul District Court

2000        Senior Judge, Patent Court

2002        Senior Judge, Seoul High Court

2006        Chief Judge, Cheongju District Court

2008        Chief Judge, Incheon District Court

2009        Chief Judge, Seoul Southern District Court

2010        Chief Judge, Patent Court

2011        President of Judicial Research and Training Institute

2012        Justice, Constitutional Court (until September 2018)

References 

South Korean judges
Justices of the Constitutional Court of Korea
Living people
1953 births
Seoul National University School of Law alumni